Poltava may refer to:

 Poltava, a city in the Poltava Oblast of Ukraine
 Poltava Airbase, a military base near the city
 Poltava Oblast, Ukraine
 Battle of Poltava, 1709, a Russian victory over Swedish forces
 Russian ship Poltava, one of a series of Russian and Soviet naval vessels named for the battle
 Poltava (poem), a poem by Alexander Pushkin, set against the background of the battle
 Poltava (chicken), a breed of poultry (named after the city)

See also
 Poltavsky (disambiguation)